Mösting is a small lunar impact crater that is located in the southeastern fringes of the Mare Insularum. It was named after Danish benefactor Johan Sigismund von Mösting. The ruined crater Sömmering lies to the northwest. To the southeast is the large crater-bay of Flammarion. Mösting has a terraced inner wall and a small central hill at the midpoint of the floor.

To the south-southeast lies the bowl-shaped Mösting A. This small feature formed the fundamental location in the selenographical coordinate system. It was defined as having the following coordinates:
{| border="0"
|Latitude:
|3° 12' 43.2" South
|-
|Longitude:
|5° 12' 39.6" West
|}
Later the coordinate system became even more precisely defined using the Lunar Laser Ranging Experiment.

Satellite craters
By convention these features are identified on lunar maps by placing the letter on the side of the crater midpoint that is closest to Mösting.

References

"A Unified Lunar Control Network — The Near Side", Merton E. Davies, Tim R. Colvin, & Donald L. Mayer, RAND Corporation, Santa Monica, 1987.

External links

Mösting at The Moon Wiki
Lunar Orbiter 4108 h3
Lunar Orbiter 4109 h3
Apollo 16 Image AS16-M-0845

Impact craters on the Moon